Thomas Hodge Allen (born April 16, 1945) is an American author and former politician who served as a member of the United States House of Representatives representing , and the Democratic nominee for the U.S. Senate in 2008 against Republican incumbent senator Susan Collins.  Allen lost to Collins (61.5% to 38.5%).

Allen was first elected in 1996, defeating Republican incumbent James Longley, Jr. with 55 percent of votes cast to Longley's 45 percent. Allen was re-elected five times, receiving over 55 percent of the vote each time in his district, until his defeat in his 2008 run for the U.S. Senate. After, Allen was appointed president and CEO of the Association of American Publishers and began his term on May 1, 2009. His book Dangerous Convictions: What's Really Wrong with the U.S. Congress came out in 2013.

Early life

Allen was born in Portland, Maine to Genevieve ("Sukey") Lahee and Charles W. Allen. His grandfather, Neal W. Allen, was a civic leader who served as chairman (mayor) of Portland from 1925-26. He graduated from Deering High School. He went on to Bowdoin College in Brunswick, Maine before winning a Rhodes Scholarship to Wadham College, Oxford. During this time he became friends with fellow Rhodes scholar Bill Clinton. After Oxford he went on to Harvard Law School and practiced as a lawyer.

Early political career
He entered the field of politics when he became a staff member for Governor Kenneth M. Curtis and later for Senator Edmund S. Muskie. Allen was elected to the city council of Portland, Maine in 1989 and served as the city's mayor between 1991 and 1992 before winning election to the House. Allen ran for governor in 1994, losing to Joe Brennan in the Democratic primary.

U.S. House

Tenure
Allen fought Republican efforts to weaken environmental rollbacks between 1996 and 2007. Allen called for a pay-as-you-go system that would require offsets to pay for new tax cuts and new spending while on the Budget Committee, much like the system Democrats enacted in their first 100 hours of Congressional control in the 110th Congress.

Allen has made health care, campaign finance reform, and small business his legislative priorities.

Committees
House Energy and Commerce Committee
Subcommittee on Health
Energy and Air Quality Subcommittee
Environment and Hazardous Materials Subcommittee
House Budget Committee
House Affordable Medicines Task Force (Co-Chairman)
House Oceans Caucus

Election history

! Year
! Office
! Winner
! Party
! Votes
! %
! Opponent
! Party
! Votes
! %
! Opponent
! Party
! Votes
! %
|-
| 1996
| rowspan=6 | 
| rowspan=6 nowrap  |Tom Allen
| rowspan=6  | Dem.
|  | 173,745
|  | 55.32
|  | Jim Longley Jr. (Inc.)
| rowspan=6  | Rep.
|  | 140,354
|  | 44.68
|colspan=4|
|-
| 1998
|  | 134,336
|  | 60.33
|  | Ross Connelly
|  | 79,160
|  | 35.55
|  | Eric Greiner
|  | Ind.
|  | 9,182
|  | 4.12
|-
| 2000
|  | 202,823
|  | 59.81
|  | Jane Amero
|  | 123,915
|  | 36.54
|  | J. Frederic Staples
|  | Lib.
|  | 12,356
|  | 3.64
|-
| 2002
|  | 172,646
|  | 63.81
|  | Steven Joyce
|  | 97,931
|  | 36.19
|colspan=4|
|-
| 2004
|  | 219,077
|  | 59.74
|  | Charlie Summers
|  | 147,663
|  | 40.26
|colspan=4|
|-
| 2006
|  | 168,709
|  | 60.67
|  | Darlene Curley
|  | 87,589
|  | 31.50
|  | Dexter Kamilewicz
|  | Ind.
|  | 21,792
|  | 7.84

Footnotes

External links
 
 Rep. Tom Allen at PoliticalBase.com
 

|-

|-

|-

1945 births
20th-century American lawyers
21st-century American politicians
Alumni of Wadham College, Oxford
American Rhodes Scholars
Bowdoin College alumni
Deering High School alumni
Democratic Party members of the United States House of Representatives from Maine
Harvard Law School alumni
Living people
Maine lawyers
Mayors of Portland, Maine
Portland, Maine City Council members
Members of Congress who became lobbyists